Luc Rombouts (born 1962) is a Belgian carillonneur and author. He is the city carillonneur of Tienen in Flemish Brabant. He is also the official carillonneur of both Leuven University carillons (one in the university library, the other in the Groot Begijnhof) and the Park Abbey. He has given numerous concerts in Europe en the USA and appeared in festivals and conventions. Together with Twan Bearda he performs in a carillon duet called The Bells' Angels, exploring, expanding and performing four hand carillon repertoire.

Publications 
In 2010, Luc Rombouts published a  reference book on the origins and development of the art of carillon playing, (Zingend brons. Vijf eeuwen beiaardmuziek in de Lage Landen en de Nieuwe Wereld,  Leuven, 2010  )  for which he was awarded the Golden Label from Klassiek Centraal and the Visser-Neerlandia Prize in 2011 from the Algemeen Nederlands Verbond for his cultural achievements.
In 2014, Rombouts published the English translation of this book under the title Singing Bronze (Leuven University Press).

Books

Theses

Articles

References

External links 
 Leuven University Carillon
 City carillon of Tienen (in Dutch)

1962 births
Living people
20th-century Belgian musicians
21st-century Belgian musicians
Belgian musicians
Carillonneurs
People from Tienen
Royal Carillon School "Jef Denyn" alumni